The Bob Kullen Coach of the Year Award is an annual award given out at the conclusion of the Hockey East regular season to the best coach in the conference as voted by the head coaches of each Hockey East team. The award was renamed in honor of Bob Kullen who served as head coach of New Hampshire in the late-80's before heart disease forced him to receive a heart transplant and subsequently retire shortly before his death in 1990.

The Coach of the Year was first awarded in 1985 and every year thereafter.

The award has been shared once, in 2009–10, between Merrimack's Mark Dennehy and New Hampshire's Dick Umile. (as of 2022)

Award winners

Winners by school

Multiple Winners

See also
Hockey East Awards

References

General

Specific

External links
Hockey East Awards (Incomplete)

Hockey East
College ice hockey coach of the year awards in the United States
College ice hockey trophies and awards in the United States